Direct cool is one of the two major types of techniques used in domestic refrigerators, the other being the "frost-free" type. Direct-cool refrigerators produce the cooling effect by a natural convection process from cooled surfaces in the insulated compartment that is being cooled. Water vapor that contacts the cooled surface freezes. Therefore, unlike frost-free units, direct-cool units require manual defrosting of the interior. Direct cool is less expensive in production and in operation, as it consumes less energy when compared to frost free refrigerators

References

Refrigerants

2. Direct Cool Vs Frost Free Refrigerators – Know the Differences